In chemistry, tetrahydroxozincate or tetrahydroxidozincate is a divalent anion (negative ion) with formula , with a central zinc atom in the +2 or (II) valence state coordinated to four hydroxide groups. It has Sp3 hybridization. It is the most common of the zincate anions, and is often called just zincate.

These names are also used for the salts containing that anion, such as sodium zincate Na2Zn(OH)4  and calcium zincate CaZn(OH)4·2H2O 

Zincate salts can be obtained by reaction of zinc oxide (ZnO) or  zinc hydroxide and a strong base like sodium hydroxide.

It is now generally accepted that the resulting solutions contain the tetrahydroxozincate ion. Earlier Raman studies had been interpreted as indicating the existence of linear  ions.

Related anions and salts

See also

 tetrachlorozincate or tetrachloridozincate, 
 tetranitratozincate,

References

Anions
Inorganic chemistry